Synchalara is a genus of moths of the family Xyloryctidae.

Species
 Synchalara argoplaca (Meyrick, 1907)
 Synchalara byrsina (Meyrick, 1907)
 Synchalara malacobryas (Meyrick, 1938)
 Synchalara minax (Meyrick, 1907)
 Synchalara rhizograpta Meyrick, 1934
 Synchalara rhombota (Meyrick, 1907)

References

 
Xyloryctidae
Xyloryctidae genera